Now That's What I Call Music! 43 or Now 43 may refer to two Now That's What I Call Music! series albums, including

Now That's What I Call Music! 43 (UK series)
Now That's What I Call Music! 43 (U.S. series)